Jeffares is a surname. Notable people with the surname include:

Brian Jeffares, New Zealand mayor
Edward Jeffares (1917–1994), South African-born Irish cricketer 
Norman Jeffares (1920–2005), Irish literary scholar
Rick Jeffares, American politician
Shaun Jeffares, South African-born Irish cricketer